Celestyal Cruises (formed in 2014) is a succession to Louis Cruises and Louis Cruise Lines. The Cruise line was a subsidiary of Louis plc (Founded in 1935 as the first travel agency in Cyprus) until November 2021 when Searchlight Capital Partners took a majority share within the Cruise Line.
Celestyal Cruises has two cruise ships. The MS Celestyal Olympia and the Celestyal Crystal. The Cruise line operates out of Athens, Greece offering itineraries on a 3,4- and 7-night basis around the Greek islands, Turkey, and the Eastern Mediterranean. It is reported that it carried 115,000 guests in 2019. Celestyal Cruises operated for six years in Cuba until 2018 and historically chartered ships to Marella Cruises, previously Thomson Cruises.

History

Celestyal Cruises
In September 2014, Louis Cruises rebranded itself as Celestyal Cruises. It is a subsidiary of Louis plc, founded in 1935 as the first travel agency in Cyprus.

2015
Celestyal renovated some of its fleet in 2015. 43 new balconies were added to the Crystal, and 227 outside cabins, 21 junior suites, and nine suites were refurbished on the Olympia. The Crystal is used for cruises in Cuba and Greece, and Olympia travels in Greece.

2016
In October 2016, it was announced Celestyal Cruises CEO Kyriakos Anastassiadis will be appointed to the position of Chairman CLIA (Cruise Lines International Association) Europe. He took up the position in January 2017.

In July 2016 the cruise line imposed a short term pause in visiting Turkish Ports in the wake of the failed coup in Turkey.

2017
In September 2017, Celestyal announced a partnership with Hays Travel to expand its customer base across the UK, making its cruises available through Hays Tour Operating Limited. Celestyal has also partnered with Air Canada Vacations, Transat, Hola Sun Holidays, Apple Vacations, Iglu and Planet Cruise.

In May 2017, Celestyal launched its redesigned website which was designed to include cruise information as well as company news and details for its value program, Celestyal Inclusive Experience.

In late 2017, Celestyal announced that it would be extending its cruise season in Greece to 10 months. The extension included seven-night Aegean cruises with overnight destinations in Mykonos and Santorini. The following month, Celestyal announced its 2019 Greek islands itineraries leaving from Piraeus, which had longer stays with more destinations included Mykonos, Samos or Kusadasi, Patmos, Heraklion (Crete), Rhodes and Santorini. The M/V Majesty was added to the Celestyal fleet in Greece for Aegean cruises in 2018, when its charter to Marella Cruises, previously Thomson Cruises, ended. In July 2018, it was announced that Majesty was sold to the Israeli company Mano Maritime.

2018
In January 2018 it was announced that Celestyal Cruises would be pulling out of Cuba after five seasons. The cruise line cited the companies need to focus on the growing demand coming from its Greek operation as the reason for this decision.

In May 2018 it was announced that Chris Theophilides would succeed Kyriakos Anastasiadis as Celestyal Cruises new CEO in June 2018.

In August 2018 it was announced that Capt. George Koumpenas had been promoted to Chief Operating Officer and Leslie Peden had been appointed Chief Commercial Officer.

At a press event in December 2018, Celestyal Cruises announced they were targeting 21% growth in guest numbers from 108,000 in 2018 to a targeted number of 130,000 guests in 2019.

2019
In April 2019 Celestyal Cruises announced it will be extending its 2020 season with a new winter itinerary on the Celestyal Olympia. The Cruises are scheduled to operate a six week season in the Adriatic homeporting out of Venice from December 2020.

2020
In January 2020, Celestyal Cruises president Kostakis Loizou was honoured for his significant contribution to the Greek cruise industry during the annual general assembly of the Association of Cruise Ship Owners and Maritime Agencies (EEKFN).

A interview in February 2020 with Celestyal Cruises CEO - Chris Theophilides revealed that the cruise lines estimated contribution to the Greek economy for 2014-2018 reached €102.5 million annually. Theophilides cited that €28m was in direct operating expenditure and €4.1m to Greek food and beverage suppliers.

In November 2020, Celestyal Cruises announced it had completed a brand refresh with a new logo and strapline - Experience Life, Experience the Journey. The new look brand will debut on its new flagship The Celestyal Experience. Peter Economides, owner and founder of Felix BNI which created the branding, said, ‘We wanted to capture the Greek DNA through the Greek love of life and to express it in a modernized interpretation of the brand design.’

2021
In January 2021 Celestyal Cruises announced a new partnership with Versonix systems to provide its Seaware booking platform to the cruise line. It was cited that Versonix was chosen due to the enhanced revenue management and crm capabilities.

In November 2021 it was revealed that Celestyal Cruises had added Thessaloniki as a homeport to its Idyllic Aegean itinerary for 2022.

On November 30, 2021 it was announced that Searchlight Capital Partners brought a majority stake in Celestyal Cruises. Louis plc, the Cypriot company that owns Celestyal, revealed that Searchlight, which has an asset portfolio estimated to be worth $6bn, will provide an initial tranche of €30m ($33.8) in senior debt financing to the Piraeus-based cruise company upon closing of the deal, together with a revolving €10m credit facility. The agreement provides for additional funding of up to €30m to support development plans. Louis will spin off Celestyal into a separate limited partnership company, Celestyal Holdings, in which Searchlight will hold a 60% stake.

Louis Cruises (1982 - 2014)

Awards
At the 2015 Greek Tourism Awards, Celestyal received four awards, one of which was the Gold Award for Themed Events. It also received two Silver Awards and one Bronze Award. The following year, it won the Cruise Line Revelation Award at the Excellence Awards in Cartagena, Spain. Celestyal received the Best Value Cruise Line of 2016 at Cruise Critic UK Editors' Picks Awards, as well as four Greek Tourism Awards in 2016.

Also in 2017, Celestyal received five top Critic Cruiser's Choice Awards, as well as five awards at the Greek Tourism Awards.

Cruise Critic Awards
In December 2017, Cruise Critic UK Editors' Picks Awards recognized Celestyal with Best for Service. The Marella Spirit also received three Cruise Critic UK Editors' Picks Awards.

Cruise Critic UK Editors’ Picks Award in December 2018 awarded Celestyal Cruises for Best Service and received four Cruise Critic Cruisers’ Choice Awards: two first-place awards (for Shore Excursions and Value) and two second-place awards (for Service and Entertainment).

In December 2019 Cruise Critic’s 11th UK Editors’ Picks Awarded Celestyal Cruises “Best for Service” 2019.

MedCruise Awards
In August 2020, Celestyal Cruises was awarded first prize at the MedCruise Awards 2020 for its solidarity initiatives amid the pandemic and its commitment to develop the cruise sector in the Eastern Mediterranean.

TV Coverage

Cruising with Jane McDonald
Celestyal was featured in the final episode of the second season of Jane McDonald's Channel 5 show, Cruising with Jane McDonald in 2017. McDonald went on a Cuban cruise that stopped in Cienfuegos, Santiago de Cuba and Montego Bay, Jamaica with an overnight in Havana.

In January 2019 it was announced that Cruising with Jane new series would feature Celestyal Cruises Idyllic Aegean Cruise which features the Greek Islands.

Music Videos
In June 2017, Greek urban pop band “REC” filmed onboard the Celestyal Olympia cruise ship to shoot the summer scenes of its new video clip entitled “A heart on the Sand”.

COVID-19 Pandemic
Celestyal Cruises due to the COVID-19 pandemic suspended all cruises since 13 March 2020. A decision issued from the company was to extend the suspension further until 6 March 2021 due to a ongoing uncertainty on travelling to Europe this summer.

Celestyal Cruises resumed cruises in June 2021 with its Idyllic Aegean itinerary. Celestyal Cruises put a second ship into operation (Celestyal Olympia) in June 2021 with a new itinerary the Legendary Archipelago that visited Thessaloniki, Mykonos, Santorini, Ag. Nikolaos (Crete) and Rhodes in Greece and Limassol in Cyprus  In August 2021 Celestyal Cruises announced it would stop cruises at the end of August 2021 and suspend its Autumn and winter cruises due to the increasing number of travel restrictions being brought in.

In October 2021 Celestyal Cruises announced its return to cruising on March 14 of 2022 with its offering of 3 and 4-night cruises followed by 7-night cruises on April 30, 2022.

Celestyal Experience
During the COVID-19 pandemic in 2020, Celestyal Cruises acquired the former Costa neoRomantica from Costa Cruises, the vessel was renamed Celestyal Experience in August of that year. A year later it was announce in September 2021 that Celestyal decided to sell the Experience. Citing, "due to the prolonged effects of the ongoing COVID-19 pandemic, it was decided not to increase the size of Celestyal Cruises’ fleet at this time and will instead continue to operate the cruise ships Celestyal Olympia and Celestyal Crystal which served the company’s needs well prior to the pandemic. In addition, the sale is expected to further support the liquidity of Celestyal Cruises," the company said.

The Celestyal Experience new owners renamed the ship The Antares Experience and was sent for scrapping in November 2021.

Fleet

Current Ships

Future Ship

Former Fleet

References

External links
 
 

 

 
Transport companies established in 1986
1986 establishments in Cyprus
Cruise lines